Ira Hobart Evans (April 11, 1844 – April 19, 1922) was an officer in the Union Army during the American Civil War and received the Medal of Honor.  He was also a prominent Texas businessman.

Early life
Evans was born in Piermont, New Hampshire on April 11, 1844.  After the death of his father, his mother moved to Barre, Vermont, and he completed his education at Barre Academy.

Civil War military service
In July 1862 he enlisted for the Civil War as a Private in Company B, 10th Vermont Volunteer Infantry Regiment.  In December 1863 he was commissioned as a First Lieutenant in the 9th U.S. Colored Troops.  In January 1865 he was promoted to Captain in the 116th U.S. Colored Troops.

In March 1865 he was promoted to brevet Major "for gallant conduct and meritorious services" and assigned as assistant Adjutant of the XXV Army Corps, Army of the James.

Medal of Honor action
General William Birney, as quoted in 1897's "The Story of American Heroism" compiled by J.W. Jones:

In the early days of April, 1865, when General Grant was moving on Petersburg, my division (the Second of the 25th Corps) held a portion of the Union line near Hatcher's Run. The main body was sheltered by a low ridge from the enemy's fire, but the rifle pits in which the pickets were posted and the open space between the pits and the ridge, was swept by the Confederate cannon and musketry. Confederate deserters were numerous, most of them reaching the rifle pits late at night or about daybreak, where, for their safety, they were detained until nightfall. An afternoon assault on the Confederate works being intended, it was very important to learn what changes had been made in them. I was directed from headquarters to have the newly arrived deserters interviewed. Being unwilling to order any member on my staff on so dangerous a duty, I called for a volunteer. Captain Evans was the only one who responded. Dismounting he passed rapidly over the ridge in front of the division, being at that time the only Union soldier in view from the Confederate line. The enemy opened a sharp fire of musketry upon him, and continued it until he disappeared in one of our rifle pits.  Having questioned the deserters and obtained the desired information, he returned through another shower of bullets and reported to me. It was a gallant feat.

Post-Civil War military service
On April 17, 1865 Evans was one of the officers in the honor guard of President Abraham Lincoln's funeral cortège.  He remained on active duty after the war, serving in Brownsville, Texas as a member General Philip H. Sheridan's occupation force.  In September 1866 he was transferred to New Orleans.  In February 1867 he was discharged in Louisville, Kentucky.

Reconstruction in Texas
Deciding to take part in the Reconstruction of Texas, he started a ranch near Corpus Christi, but lost his investment through the dishonesty of his partner.  Evans then joined the Freedmen's Bureau but quickly resigned out of anger with his superiors, whom he deemed incompetent. He then joined the Internal Revenue Service, first in Eagle Pass and then in Corpus Christi.

Member of the Texas House of Representatives
At the urging of Republican gubernatorial candidate Edmund Jackson Davis, in 1869 Evans ran for and won a seat in the Texas House of Representatives.  In 1870 he was elected Speaker of the House (at age 26, he was the youngest person ever to hold that post).  Evans was removed from office when Democrats returned to power at the end of Texas Reconstruction in 1871.

Business career
Unlike most Republicans who were active in post-Civil War Reconstruction, after leaving politics Evans did not return to the northern states, instead settling in Austin and beginning a business career.  He became general manager of Houston's Texas Land Company in 1872, and Secretary of the Houston and Great Northern Railroad Company in 1873.  After the H. & G. N. merged with the International Railroad in 1874, Evans was elected Secretary of the International-Great Northern Railroad, and served as a member of the board of directors from 1875 to 1908.  From 1880 to 1906 he was President of the New York and Texas Land Company.  Evans was a founder of the Austin National Bank and served on the board of directors from 1890 until his death.  In 1897 he was appointed Receiver of the Austin Rapid Transit Railway Company, a post he held until 1902.  From 1902 to 1903 he was President of the Austin Electric Railway Company.  He was also a founder and President of the Texas Life Insurance Company.

Philanthropy, religious activity and civic involvement
Evans maintained a lifelong interest in the cause of educating African-Americans, including serving on the board of trustees of Austin's Tillotson College (now Huston–Tillotson University) from 1881 to 1920, and president of the board from 1909 to 1920.  Evans also donated the funds to construct a residence for the president of the college, and the funds to create a program to train construction workers.  The college's Evans Industrial Building, constructed in 1912 and refurbished in 1984, was named for him and has been designated a Texas Historical Site.

Evans was active in both the Congregational and Presbyterian churches and served as president of the American Home Missionary Society.  He was a member of the board of trustees of the First Presbyterian Church in Austin and president of the board of trustees of Austin's First Congregational Church of Austin for five years.

He was also involved in several civic causes.  His Austin home was the meeting place for the Texas State Historical Association. He was a member of the Society of Colonial Wars and the Military Order of the Loyal Legion of the United States.  In 1896 Evans became a member of the Vermont Society of the Sons of the American Revolution (SAR) and was the founder and first president of the Texas Society of the SAR.  He was assigned national member number 2751 and Vermont Society number 51.

Evans' home the North-Evans Chateau, is now the location of the Austin Woman's Club and is an Austin Historic Landmark.

Personal life

Ira Evans was married twice.  In July 1871 he married Francese A. Hurlbut of Upper Alton, Illinois, with whom he had three sons, Wilber Leslie Evans, Hobart Yale Evans, and Francis Hurlbut Evans.  After their 1917 divorce, in 1920 he married Jessie M. Stewart.

He was the cousin of Texas businessman Timothy Dwight Hobart.

The Ira Hobart Evans Papers are part of the University of Tulsa's McFarlin Library.

Retirement and death
Evans retired to San Diego, California, in 1921 and died there on April 19, 1922. He was buried in Berlin Corners Cemetery, Berlin, Vermont.

Medal of Honor citation
Citation: (presented on March 24, 1892)
For extraordinary heroism on 2 April 1865, while serving with Company B, 116th Colored Infantry, in action at Hatcher's Run, Virginia. Captain Evans voluntarily passed between the lines, under a heavy fire from the enemy, and obtained important information.

See also

List of American Civil War Medal of Honor recipients: A–F

References
 American Ancestry: Giving Name and Descent, in the Male Line, of Americans Whose Ancestors Settled in the United States Previous to the Declaration of Independence, edited by Thomas Patrick Hughes, Frank Munsell published by Joel Munsell's Sons, Albany, New York,  1894, Volume 9, page 201
 A History of the Tenth Regiment, Vermont Volunteers, by Edwin Mortimer Haynes, 1894, pages 83 to 86
 Huston–Tillotson University 2008–2009 School Year Bulletin
 Overreached on All Sides: the Freedmen's Bureau Administrators in Texas, William Lee Richter, 1991, page 182 to 183
 Texas Society, Sons of the American Revolution web site
 General Register of the Society of Colonial Wars, published by the Society, 1911, Second Supplement, page 256
 Black and White: a Monthly Magazine of Facts for Insurance Policy, Volume 13, Number 1, October 1896, page 344
 A National Register of the Society, Sons of the American Revolution, published Sons of the American Revolution, 1902, page 957
 A History of Texas and Texans, by Francis White Johnson, Eugene Campbell Barker, and Ernest William Winkler, 1914, Volume III, page 1281
 Register of the Military Order of the Loyal Legion of the United States, compiled by Joshua Harris Aubin, 1906, page 82
 One Thousand New Hampshire Notables, by Henry Harrison Metcalf and Frances Matilda Abbott, 1919, page 442
 Austin Woman's Club web site
 Handbook of Texas Online, Ira Hobart Evans biography
 University of Tulsa, McFarlin Library, Ira Hobart Evans Papers
 Deeds of Valor: From Records in the Archives of the United States Government, Walter F. Beyer, Oscar Frederick Keydel, Henry Martin Duffield, 1907, page 516
 The Story of American Heroism, compiled by J.W. Jones, 1897, pages 624 to 625
 Town of Berlin, Vermont web site, Ira Hobart Evans page
 Newspaper article, Major Ira H. Evans Dies, Oakland (California) Tribune, April 20, 1922

External links

1844 births
1922 deaths
United States Army Medal of Honor recipients
People from Grafton County, New Hampshire
Sons of the American Revolution
Speakers of the Texas House of Representatives
Union Army officers
American Civil War recipients of the Medal of Honor
Burials in Vermont
Republican Party members of the Texas House of Representatives
California Republicans